Haunted Mouse is a 1965 Tom and Jerry short directed and produced by Chuck Jones. The title is a play on words of "haunted house".

Plot
Jerry's second cousin Merlin, who looks identical to Jerry but wears a black top hat, bow tie, cloak, yellow gloves and carries a walking stick, visits Jerry in his house. The stick is actually a wand and he lifts a fence panel with a spell as he enters.

Tom is perched outside Jerry's home, waiting for the mouse to come out, when Merlin lifts him with a spell in order to get into the house. He rings the doorbell and Jerry welcomes him with a hug. Merlin then snaps his fingers and lifts the spell on Tom, who twists his face in puzzlement. Merlin's hat falls off his head and a rabbit comes out. He instructs it to retreat into the hat and it hops along the floor and hangs itself up. His acrobatic gloves and regal robe also hang themselves up on command.

Jerry prepares for a meal and sets out to the refrigerator for something for them to eat. Jerry speeds to the elevator in the refrigerator and presses a button to ascend to the third level. Jerry packs a radish into his "cart" and then Tom pokes his head into the refrigerator, where his nose gets removed by an unaware Jerry. Tom notices that his nose is missing and uses his hand to creep up on Jerry. He pokes Jerry and points to his missing nose and is given the radish. Tom realizes something is wrong and creeps up behind Jerry again, pokes him and points to the radish on his nose. Jerry grins and this time gives him his real nose, which Tom grabs, frightening Jerry and causing him to flee into the elevator. As Tom rejoices in the return of his nose, Jerry trips him up with his enormous speed. Tom extends his arms into Jerry's mousehole, but grabs Merlin instead. Merlin casts a spell to open Tom's mouth and keep it open, so he can go inside and frees all the mice, birds and fish that Tom has eaten. He climbs back into Tom's palm and releases the spell.

Jerry sets out for more food, but Tom has squeezed into the tiny elevator door. Tom pops out and chases Jerry for a minute, but then runs away briefly, thinking that it is the "haunted mouse". Tom returns and towers over Jerry and chases him back into his hole. Tom reaches inside, but all he gets is Merlin's hat. Then, a rabbit pops out and squeezes Tom's nose. Tom grabs it and drops it behind him, and a second rabbit comes out and kisses the cat's nose. The third rabbit pulls Tom's cheek and finally he pulls out a sledgehammer. Tom hands it to the rabbits as he shakes the hat to attempt to get more out of it. Then he turns around and the third rabbit, standing on top of the other two, uses the sledgehammer to hit him. Tom falls to the floor and his bump grows taller with a surrender flag tied to it. Eventually, Merlin shakes hands with Jerry and snaps his fingers, and "The End" appears in five different languages, including Fin (French and Spanish), Ende (German), 劇終 (Jùzhōng) (Chinese), Fine (Italian) and finally in English.

Additional Crew
Vocal Effects: Mel Blanc
In Charge of Production: Les Goldman
Co-Director & Layout Artist: Maurice Noble

References

External links
 
 

1965 films
1965 short films
Short films directed by Chuck Jones
Films directed by Maurice Noble
Films scored by Eugene Poddany
1965 animated films
Tom and Jerry short films
Animated films without speech
1960s American animated films
1965 comedy films
Films about magic and magicians
Metro-Goldwyn-Mayer short films
Metro-Goldwyn-Mayer animated short films
MGM Animation/Visual Arts short films